Giacomo Aimoni (born 23 December 1939) is an Italian ski jumper. He competed in the 1964 and 1968 Winter Olympics.

References

1939 births
Living people
Ski jumpers at the 1964 Winter Olympics
Ski jumpers at the 1968 Winter Olympics
Italian male ski jumpers
Olympic ski jumpers of Italy
Sportspeople from the Province of Brescia